Reginald IV may refer to:

 Reginald IV of Hainaut (c. 950–1013)
 Reinald IV, Duke of Guelders and Jülich (1365–1423)